Buildings called National Palace include:
National Palace (Dominican Republic), in Santo Domingo
National Palace (El Salvador), in San Salvador
National Palace (Ethiopia), in Addis Ababa; also known as the Jubilee Palace
National Palace (Guatemala), in Guatemala City
National Palace (Haiti), in Port-au-Prince
National Palace (Nicaragua), in Managua
National Palace (Mexico), in Mexico City
National Palace Museum in Taipei, Taiwan (Republic of China)
Palau Nacional (en: National Palace), in Barcelona, Spain
National Youth and Children's Palace (Sometimes referred as National Palace), in Tbilisi

In Portugal:
Ajuda National Palace, in Lisbon
Mafra National Palace, in Mafra
Pena National Palace, in Sintra
Sintra National Palace, in Sintra
Queluz National Palace, in Queluz